Vet Emergency 2 is a PC CD-ROM computer game in which the player is a veterinarian and must take care of animals, earning points for treatment and efficiency. It was created by Legacy Interactive, and is the sequel to Vet Emergency.

References

External links

2003 video games
Medical video games
Video game sequels
Video games developed in the United States
Windows games
Windows-only games
Legacy Games games